A Violent Prosecutor is a 2016 South Korean crime film directed by Lee Il-hyung, produced by Guk Su Ran and starring Hwang Jung-min and Gang Dong-won. It was released in South Korea on February 3, 2016 by Showbox.

Plot
Byun Jae-Wook (Hwang Jung-min) is a short-tempered prosecutor who only pursues the truth. He is notorious for his rough and tough investigations. A suspect who is a small-time criminal, under the interrogation of Byun Jae-Wook, is then found dead. All the evidence indicate Byun Jae-Wook as the criminal. Byun Jae-Wook is prosecuted and gets 15 years in prison.

At first he is ill-treated by the prisoners. He helps some guards to avoid court room fees and in other legal matters. This gains him a special position in prison. He helps out both the officers and prisoners who are in jail through his legal knowledge and experiences. This makes prisoners loyal to him and he treats them well whenever he receives gifts from the guards. He shares food and cigarettes to other inmates. People in jail call him “Sir Young Gam” which means Elder.One day a man who owns a company comes to him and asks advice regarding a man he beat up because of raping his daughter. He gives him an answer. The prisoner then asks what he could do for Jae wook, answering he would know at a later time.

Five years later, Byun Jae-Wook meets young fraudster Chi-Won (Gang Dong-won), in prison. Chi-Won knows details about Byun Jae-Wook’s case. Byun Jae-Wook trains Chi-Won to carry out his plan outside of prison. Using his knowledge as a former prosecutor, he gets Chi-Won free. Byun Jae-Wook prepares a counterattack on those who framed him.

Chi-won meets up with one of the friends of the suspect in Jae-Wook’s murder case. The man admitted that the suspect indeed had asthma and had to have an inhaler with him all the time, unbeknownst to him he was being recorded by Chi-won who sends the file back to Jae wook. Jae wook prepares papers for his parole and sends the file along with the recording to the judge holding his case. this information reaches the congressional candidate who was assistant general of the prosecutors office and does all means to shut the case down. The whistleblower was found and was beaten until half his body had been paralyzed. Fearing for his own life Chi-Won takes the chance to get away from Byun Jae-Wook. When Jae-Wook realized Chi-Won’s plan he seeks the help of the prisoners whom he formerly assisted in their cases. Byun Jae-Wook and Chi-Won get together and start planning against Jong-Gil (Lee Sung-min) who was the Asst. Prosecutor General during Byun Jae-Wook's trial period and the person who had convinced Byun Jae-Wook to defend himself in a self-defense manner which resulted in his jail time. In the flashbacks shown  It is revealed that Jong-Gil, who is running in an upcoming election now, then was working with a builder to encroach an ecologically significant land and had visited the interrogation room, beating up the prisoner and getting hold of his inhaler, leading to the prisoner's death by suffocation.

Jae-Wook is able to win his retrial due to a recording he obtained of Jong-Gil admitting he had possession of the inhaler. Afterwards, we see that when Jae-Wook is released from prison, Chi-Won greets him with a bag of tofu, suggesting that they work together on a new item. The film ends with Jae-Wook telling Chi-Won to live honestly, citing John 16:33 from the bible, and smacking Chi-Won on the back of his head.

Cast

Main characters
Hwang Jung-min as Byun Jae-wook
Gang Dong-won as Chi-won
Lee Sung-min as Assistant Prosecutor General Jong-gil
Park Sung-woong as Yang Min-woo
 Kim Byeong-ok as President Park
 Han Chae-young as  Jang Hyun-seok
 Kim Ung-su as Kang Young-sik, the Congressman
 Shin So-yul as Kim Ha-na

Others 
 Park Ji-hwan as Cheol Goo
 Park Hoon as Cheol Goo's subordinate
 Cha Bo-sung as a protester.
 Shin Hye-sun as Yoon-ah, an electoral district bookkeeper

Reception
The film grossed  in the first four days of release at the South Korean box office. A Violent Prosecutor is the 2nd highest-grossing South Korean film of 2016, with a  worldwide gross.

Awards and nominations

See also
 A Prophet
 The Shawshank Redemption

References

External links
 
 
 

2010s crime comedy films
South Korean crime comedy films
South Korean buddy films
Showbox films
2010s buddy films
Films set in North Gyeongsang Province
2010s South Korean films